Norman Kelly (born 10 October 1970) is a Northern Irish former footballer who played for a number of clubs throughout his career.

Kelly began his career with Oldham Athletic and spent time on loan with Wigan Athletic before spells in Scotland with Fife sides Dunfermline Athletic and Raith Rovers. After moving back to his native Northern Ireland, Kelly played in Sweden and Malaysia before having a five-year spell in Australia with Canberra Cosmos. When that ended in 1999, Kelly moved to Linfield, where he picked up two league titles and a cup in his three years there. Kelly moved to Glenavon in the summer of 2002 but was released just a few months later.
Kelly moved to the United States in 2003 after his short spell with Crusaders where he coached junior football.

Kelly won caps for Northern Ireland between under-18 and B team level.

Honours

Linfield
Irish Premier League: 2
 1999-00, 2000-01
Irish Cup: 1
 2001-02

References

1970 births
Living people
Association footballers from Northern Ireland
Scottish Football League players
NIFL Premiership players
National Soccer League (Australia) players
Canberra Cosmos FC players
Crusaders F.C. players
Dunfermline Athletic F.C. players
Glenavon F.C. players
Glentoran F.C. players
Linfield F.C. players
Oldham Athletic A.F.C. players
Raith Rovers F.C. players
Wigan Athletic F.C. players
Expatriate footballers in Malaysia
Expatriate footballers in Brunei
Brunei (Malaysia Premier League team) players
Association football midfielders